Beowali is a village situated alongside Jalalpur–Gujrat road in the district of Gujrat, Pakistan. 

Villages in Gujrat District